The Brit Award for International Album is an award given by the British Phonographic Industry (BPI), an organisation which represents record companies and artists in the United Kingdom. The accolade is presented at the Brit Awards, an annual celebration of British and international music. The winners and nominees are determined by the Brit Awards voting academy with over one-thousand members, which comprise record labels, publishers, managers, agents, media, and previous winners and nominees. 

The award was first presented in 1977 as International Album. The accolade was not handed out between 1982 and 2001 and has been defunct as of 2011.

Recipients

1970s

2000s
{| class="wikitable" style="font-size:1.00em; line-height:1.5em;"
|- bgcolor="#bebebe"
|- bgcolor="#bebebe"
! width="5%" | Year
! width="35%" | Album
! width="60%" | Artist(s)
|-
|rowspan="6" style="text-align:center;"| 2002 (22nd)
|-style="background:#FAEB86;"
| Fever'| Kylie Minogue 
|-
| Discovery| Daft Punk 
|-
| Is This It| The Strokes 
|-
| Songs in A Minor| Alicia Keys
|-
| Survivor| Destiny's Child 
|-
|rowspan="6" style="text-align:center;"| 2003 (23rd)
|-style="background:#FAEB86;"
| The Eminem Show| Eminem 
|-
| By the Way| Red Hot Chili Peppers 
|-
| Come Away with Me| Norah Jones 
|-
| Missundaztood| Pink 
|-
| Songs in A Minor| Alicia Keys 
|-
|rowspan="6" style="text-align:center;"| 2004 (24th)
|-style="background:#FAEB86;"
| Justified| Justin Timberlake 
|-
| Dangerously in Love| Beyoncé 
|-
| Elephant| The White Stripes 
|-
| Speakerboxxx/The Love Below| Outkast 
|-
| Stripped| Christina Aguilera 
|-
|rowspan="6" style="text-align:center;"| 2005 (25th)
|-style="background:#FAEB86;"
| Scissor Sisters| Scissor Sisters
|-
| Hot Fuss| The Killers 
|- 
| How to Dismantle an Atomic Bomb| U2 
|-
| Songs About Jane| Maroon 5 
|- 
| Speakerboxxx/The Love Below| Outkast 
|-
|rowspan="6" style="text-align:center;"| 2006 (26th)
|-style="background:#FAEB86;"
| American Idiot| Green Day 
|-
| Confessions on a Dance Floor| Madonna 
|-
| Funeral| Arcade Fire 
|-
| How to Dismantle an Atomic Bomb| U2
|-
| Late Registration| Kanye West 
|-
|rowspan="6" style="text-align:center;"| 2007 (27th)
|-style="background:#FAEB86;"
| Sam's Town| The Killers 
|- 
| FutureSex/LoveSounds| Justin Timberlake 
|- 
| Modern Times| Bob Dylan 
|- 
| St. Elsewhere| Gnarls Barkley 
|- 
| Ta-Dah| Scissor Sisters 
|-
|rowspan="6" style="text-align:center;"| 2008 (28th)
|-style="background:#FAEB86;"
| Echoes, Silence, Patience & Grace| Foo Fighters 
|-
| Because of the Times| Kings of Leon 
|- 
| Long Road Out of Eden| Eagles 
|-
| Neon Bible| Arcade Fire 
|-
| X| Kylie Minogue 
|-
|rowspan="6" style="text-align:center;"| 2009 (29th)
|-style="background:#FAEB86;"
| Only by the Night| Kings of Leon 
|- 
| Black Ice| AC/DC 
|- 
| Day & Age| The Killers 
|- 
| Fleet Foxes| Fleet Foxes  
|- 
| Oracular Spectacular| MGMT 
|-
|}

2010s

Multiple nominations and awards

Notes
 Songs in A Minor (2002–2003), Speakerboxxx/The Love Below (2004–2005), How to Dismantle an Atomic Bomb'' (2005–2006) Double Nominated

References

Brit Awards
 
Awards established in 1977
Awards established in 2002
Awards disestablished in 1977
Awards disestablished in 2011
Album awards